Premier Badminton League (PBL) is a team badminton league operating in India. Sportz & Live Private Limited (Sportzlive) has the rights to operate and execute the Premier Badminton League.

The inaugural season of PBL was held from 2 to 17 January 2016. Delhi Dashers (formerly Delhi Acers) defeated Mumbai Rockets in the final to clinch the title. The second season began on 22 December 2016 and came to end on 14 January 2017 with the Chennai Smashers headed by P. V. Sindhu clinching the title in the finals. The third season began on 23 December 2017 and came to end on 14 January 2018 with Hyderabad Hunters headed by Carolina Marin emerging as the champions. Bengaluru Raptors won the last two editions in 2018-19 and 2020, becoming the only team to win the title twice.

Organisation

Tournament format 
Teams play each other in round-robin format in league stage. Each team plays six ties in the league stage in which each tie consists of five matches. The matches played are two Men's singles, Women's singles, Men's doubles and Mixed doubles. Each of these matches are best of 3 games. Teams earn one point for each regular match win; in addition, each team must choose a Trump match, where a win is worth two points, and a loss subtracts one point. After league stage, the top four teams in the table will qualify for the knockout stage. The winners of semi-finals goes into the final, in which the winner will be crowned the PBL champions.

Player auctions 
The player auctions are usually held at the end of each year for the subsequent season. Professional players from around the world enter the bidding where teams buy them. The league has helped players more than double their annual earnings from prize money in the year 2018. According to the prominent Danish player Victor Axelsen, this was a crucial part of their annual income.

Fifth Season 
The fifth season auctions were held on 26 November 2019 in New Delhi.

2020 being the Olympic year, key players like Saina Nehwal, Kidambi Srikanth, Carolina Marin, Victor Axelsen and others have decided to skip the season.

Some of the players were traded between Mumbai, Chennai and Pune teams ahead of the season.

Franchises 
Currently seven franchises compete in the league. There were nine franchises in the previous season(2018–19).

Current Franchises

Seasons

First Season (Season 1) 
In 2016, the league was renamed from Indian Badminton League to Premier Badminton League, and still followed same format. This first season of the PBL started on 2 January 2016 and concluded on 17 January 2016. The four teams to proceed to the semi-finals were Delhi Dashers, Chennai Smashers, Awadhe Warriors and Mumbai Rockets. Delhi beat Chennai 4-3 and Mumbai Rockets beat Awadhe Warriors 3–1 to proceed to the final. Delhi Dashers won the tournament after beating Mumbai Rockets 4–3.

Second Season (Season 2)
The second season of the Premier Badminton League started on 1 January 2017 and concluded on 14 January 2017. It followed the same format as the earlier league, and the four teams to proceed to the semi-finals were Awadhe Warriors, Mumbai Rockets, Chennai Smashers and Hyderabad Hunters. Chennai Smashers beat Awadhe Warriors 4-1 and Mumbai Rockets beat Hyderabad Hunters 3-(-1) to proceed to the final. Chennai Smashers won the tournament after beating Mumbai Rockets 4–3.

Third Season (Season 3)
The third season of the PBL started on 23 December 2017 and concluded on 14 January 2018. Hyderabad Hunters were crowned the champions after they beat Bengaluru Blasters 4–3 in the final tie.

Fourth Season (Season 4) 

The fourth season of the PBL was played from 22 December 2018 to 13 January 2019. In the fourth season Bengaluru Raptors took their first title after beating Mumbai Rockets in the final.

Fifth Season (Season 5) 

The fifth season of the PBL started on 20 January 2020 and concluded on 9 February 2020. Seven teams participated in the season. Delhi Dashers and Ahmedabad Smash Masters did not participate in this edition. Bengaluru Raptors beat Northeastern Warriors 4–2 in the finals to win their second title. It was also their second consecutive title in PBL.

Tournament seasons and results 
Five seasons of PBL have been played since the first season in 2016. They are:

Teams' performances

Team rosters

Broadcast rights
In 2013 STAR Sports India purchased the broadcasting rights for India.

See also

 Indian Premier League
 Indian Super League

References

 
Badminton tournaments in India
Professional sports leagues in India
2013 establishments in India
Sport in India
Sports leagues established in 2013